Ain't Nothin But a Party is the 14th album by the Gap Band, released in 1995 on Raging Bull Records. AllMusic dismissed the album as technically proficient but weak on grooves and hooks, "one of the least funky records the Gap Band ever released."

Track listing

References

External links
 Ain't Nothin' But A Party at Discogs

1995 albums
The Gap Band albums